Askio (Pronunciation: As•ki•o) is a mountain range in the northwestern part of the Kozani and the eastern part of the Kastoria regional units in northern Greece. There are forests in the northern part. The nearest mountains are the Verno to the northwest, the Vourinos to the south and the Vermio to the northeast. It is drained by tributaries of the Aliakmonas to the west and south, and towards the Lake Vegoritida to the northeast.

The nearest towns are Siatista to the south, Ptolemaida to the northeast and Kozani to the southeast. Mountain villages in the Askio mountains include Vlasti in the central part, Eratyra and Skiti in the south and Milochori, Anarrachi, Variko and Kleisoura in the north. The Egnatia Odos motorway (Igoumenitsa - Ioannina - Kozani - Thessaloniki) runs south of the mountains.

See also

List of mountains in Greece

References

External links
 Askio (Siniatsiko), Kozani terrain map by Geopsis

Landforms of Kozani (regional unit)
Mountain ranges of Greece
Landforms of Western Macedonia